The 2019 European U23 Wrestling Championships was the 5th edition of European U23 Wrestling Championships of combined events, and took place from March 4 to 10 in Novi Sad, Serbia.

Medal table

Team ranking

Medal summary

Men's freestyle

Men's Greco-Roman

Women's freestyle

References

External links 

2019 in European sport
European Wrestling U23 Championships
Sports competitions in Novi Sad
International wrestling competitions hosted by Serbia